Hue (Hadoop User Experience) is an open-source SQL Cloud Editor, licensed under the Apache License 2.0.

Overview
Hue is an open-source SQL Assistant for querying Databases & Data Warehouses and collaborating. Its goal is to make self service data querying more widespread in organizations.

The Hue team provides releases on its website. Hue is also present in the Cloudera Data Platform and the Hadoop services of the cloud providers Amazon AWS, Google Cloud Platform, and Microsoft Azure.

References

External links
 Hue - The open source SQL Assistant for Data Warehouses

Hadoop
Big data products